Hiten Paintal (born 19 December 1978) is an Indian film and television actor. He is the son of veteran actor Paintal and made his debut in the 2001 film Tere Liye. He quit television in early 2008 and has since worked in films.

Filmography

Films

TV Shows

Yeh Hai Mere Apne
A.D.Av - Acting and Dance Academy
Ek Ladki Anjaani Si
Kasauti Zindagi Ki
C.I.D. (Episodic role)
Ssshhhh...Koi Hai (Episodic role)
Akela (Episodic role)
Raat Hone Ko Hai (Episodic role)
 Muskuraane Ki Vajah Tum Ho as Yash

Web series

References

External links

Living people
Indian male film actors
1978 births
Indian male comedians
Male actors from Jammu and Kashmir